Grand Canyon Scenic Airlines is an American regional airline based in Paradise, Nevada, United States. It operates sightseeing flights from Boulder City Municipal Airport in Boulder City, Nevada. Scenic has been owned by Grand Canyon Airlines since 2008.

History
Scenic Airlines was started by John and Elizabeth Seibold and their single engine Cessna airplane in North Las Vegas Airport in 1967. Between 1967 and 1993 Scenic Airlines grew to be one of the world's largest fixed-wing air tour operations. In 2000, John Seibold was recognized by the Las Vegas Review Journal as being one of the most influential businessmen in Las Vegas in the previous 100 years. In 1977, Scenic Airlines purchased the design and manufacturing rights to turboprop-powered conversions of the Cessna 402 and Cessna 414 from American Jet Industries. In 1983, the airline co-developed modifications to the de Havilland Canada DHC-6 Twin Otter to make it more suitable for use as an air tour airplane. The airline eventually moved to Las Vegas's Harry Reid International Airport (LAS).

In the late 1960s, Scenic operated scheduled passenger flights on a route from Salt Lake City to Blanding, Utah, making stops at five other cities. During the mid-1970s, Scenic operated from a hub in Las Vegas providing service to Grand Canyon, Page, and Yuma in Arizona, to Long Beach, Palm Springs, Carlsbad, El Centro, and Death Valley in California, and to Ely, and Elko, Nevada. The carrier flew de Havilland Canada DHC-6 Twin Otter and Fairchild Swearingen Metroliner aircraft.
  
During the 1980s Scenic operated a vintage Ford Trimotor aircraft on its flight seeing tours. This was the type aircraft operated by the original Scenic Airways of the late 1920s that also operated flight seeing service across the Grand Canyon.

In 1994 the Seibolds sold the airline to SkyWest Airlines and it continued to see growth until it merged with Eagle Canyon Airlines in 1999. In 1999, Scenic was operating scheduled passenger service between Las Vegas (LAS) and Grand Canyon National Park Airport (GCN) with Fokker F27 turboprops. In the spring of 2006, citing rising fuel costs, the airline announced it would be ceasing scheduled passenger operations in order to focus on its sightseeing flights, thus abandoning its scheduled services using its fleet of three Beechcraft 1900 turboprop aircraft. Almost all of the scheduled service flights, including those to Ely, Nevada, were Essential Air Service routes and were then picked up by Air Midwest operating as US Airways Express.

On March 29, 2007, Scenic Airlines was sold to Grand Canyon Airlines and was subsequently renamed Grand Canyon Scenic Airlines. The airline continued to operate from the Boulder City airport providing services to Grand Canyon West, Grand Canyon, Page, Arizona, Monument Valley, Utah, and Rainbow Bridge, Utah.  At that time, Grand Canyon Scenic Airlines continued to operate sightseeing flight services to the Grand Canyon every day of the year.

On March 19, 2009, Grand Canyon Scenic Airlines moved its operations at the Boulder City airport into the company's new Boulder City Aerocenter, a  terminal.

Destinations

Scheduled flight destinations
Arizona
Grand Canyon South
Grand Canyon West
Page
Nevada
Boulder City
Elko
Ely

Scheduled sightseeing destinations
Grand Canyon
Monument Valley

Accidents
Since it was founded in 1966, Scenic Airlines has experienced at least five fatal accidents.

 On October 16, 1971 a Scenic Airlines Cessna 402 en route from North Las Vegas Airport to the Grand Canyon crashed while attempting to turn away from poor weather conditions on a sightseeing tour. The pilot and all nine passengers were killed.
 On November 30, 1975 a flight from Ely, Nevada to Elko, Nevada in a Scenic Cessna 402 crashed in poor weather due to improper IFR procedures. The pilot and the sole passenger were killed.
 On July 21, 1980 a Cessna 404 Titan departing the Grand Canyon Airport for Phoenix, Arizona experienced an engine failure on take-off due to foreign material, improper maintenance, and improper procedures. All eight persons aboard (seven passengers and one crew member) were killed.
 On September 20, 1996 a Cessna T207A operated by Scenic Airlines was being re-positioned at night from Grand Canyon, Arizona to St. George, Utah. For reasons undetermined, the airplane collided with the top of a  bluff killing the sole occupant.
 On October 8, 1997 a Cessna 208B Grand Caravan operated by Scenic Airlines departed Montrose, Colorado for a flight to Page, Arizona. The wreckage was located among pine trees and exhibited evidence of a steep descent angle consistent with a stall or spin. All eight passengers and pilot were killed. The wreckage of the Cessna 208B Grand Caravan crash sits at the Embry-Riddle Aeronautical University, Prescott Arizona, Robertson Crash Laboratory, where it is used by the students of the crash investigation class taught by Safety Science Professor William D. Waldock.

Notes

References

External links

 Scenic Airlines (English)
 Scenic Airlines (Japanese)

Regional airlines of the United States
Regional Airline Association members
Companies based in Paradise, Nevada
Airlines established in 1967
Boulder City, Nevada
Airlines based in Nevada
1967 establishments in Nevada